The Song Ramones the Same is a tribute album done by various artists as a tribute to the Ramones. The title is a reference to the multiple works of Led Zeppelin entitled The Song Remains the Same. The album reached #15 on the Swedish albums chart, while the single "I Wanna Be Your Boyfriend" peaked just outside the top 40.

Track listing
 "Rockaway Beach" - Sahara Hotnights
 "The KKK Took My Baby Away" - Cool Millions
 "Blitzkrieg Bop" - Sort Sol
 "I Remember You" - The Nomads & Kissettes
 "Havana Affair"- D-A-D
 "What'd Ya Do" - Hellacopters
 "I Wanna Be Your Boyfriend" - Per Gessle
 "Mama's Boy"- Satirnine
 "I Just Wanna Have Something to Do" - The Dictators
 "Mental Hell"- Sator
 "Now I Wanna Sniff Some Glue" - Whale
 "I'm Not Afraid of Life" - Wolf
 "Bonzo Goes to Bitburg" - Wayne Kramer
 "Carbona Not Glue" - Toilet Böys
 "I Believe In Miracles" - Maryslim
 "I Can't Make It On Time"- Wilmer X
 "Return of Jackie & Judy" - Danko Jones
 "Pet Semetary" - Backyard Babies
 "Questioningly" - Jesse Malin

References

Punk rock compilation albums
2002 compilation albums
Ramones tribute albums